William T. Evans (1843 - November 25, 1918) was an American art collector.

Life
He was born in Ireland, and grew up in Scotch Plains, New Jersey. He studied architecture at the New York Free School.
He was President of the Mills & Gibb, and Mills Gibb Corporation.

He collected art by Childe Hassam, J. Alden Weir, Lillian Genth, George Inness, and Frederick Ballard Williams. He gave 160 paintings to the U.S. National Gallery (now the Smithsonian American Art Museum) in 1915, also donating a number to the Montclair Art Museum.

His letters are held at the Smithsonian's Archives of American Art.

He died at his home in Glen Ridge, New Jersey, on November 25, 1918.

References

1843 births
1918 deaths
American art collectors
Mills & Gibb
Irish emigrants to the United States (before 1923)